The 2014 World RX of Germany was the ninth round of the inaugural season of the FIA World Rallycross Championship. The event was held at the Estering in Buxtehude, Lower Saxony.

The event holds two World Championship records - it features the most entrants in an event (41), as well as the smallest margin of victory with Citroën driver Petter Solberg of Norway beating Audi driver Mattias Ekström of Sweden by five thousands of a second in the final.

Heats

Semi-finals

Semi-final 1

Semi-final 2

Final

Championship standings after the event

References

External links

|- style="text-align:center"
|width="35%"|Previous race:2014 World RX of France
|width="30%"|FIA World Rallycross Championship2014 season
|width="35%"|Next race:2014 World RX of Italy
|- style="text-align:center"
|width="35%"|Previous race:None
|width="30%"|World RX of Germany
|width="35%"|Next race:2015 World RX of Germany
|- style="text-align:center"

Germany
World RX